Primer Group of Companies is a Philippine company engaged in the retail sale and distribution of consumer brands and products. The company carries international brands mostly lifestyle products. The Primer Group also operates its own lifestyle boutique which includes Res/Toe/Run, The Travel Club, Ladybag, Flight001, Bratpack, GRND, General and R.O.X .In addition to the retail and distribution, The Primer Group recently opened its first retail and merchandising academy - APEX.

History 
The Primer Group was founded in the Philippines in 1985.  It was formerly called Primer International Corporation (PIC) as a trading company, importing seasonal merchandise. In 1992, the company Primer Group ventured into apparel licensing of Disney and Warner Bros. Later the same year, Uniglobe Travelware Co., Inc. (UTCI) was established, opening the Primer Group's first retail concept store specializing in luggage; The Travel Club. Five years later, the first Bratpack store was launched; a unique lifestyle concept store for the young, hip and bold generation of today.

The company continued to grow in the year 2000s. From a retail and distribution company in the Philippines, Primer Group expanded business to its neighboring regions in Asia.

To date, the company distributes to Hong Kong, Indonesia, Japan, Malaysia, Philippines, Singapore, Thailand with 100 free-standing concept stores and 600 consignment deals in the Association of South-East Asian Nations (ASEAN). The brands carried by the Primer Group include Consumer and Industrial products. The consumer brands carried by the Primer Group include DC,  Quicksilver, Volcom, Roxy, Fitflop, Kickers, KruZin, Native, Olukai, Sanuk, Sledgers, Tretorn, Ace, Eagle Creek, Delsey, Design Go, Mendoza, Tumi, Victorinox, World Traveller, Boxfresh, Eastpak, Ellesse, Gaiam, Hedgren, High Sierra, Jansport, Kangol, Slenderstone, Timbuk2, Tough Jeansmith, Outdoor Gear, Coghlans, Columbia, Mountain Hardware, Nalgene, Nathan, Salomon, Salvas, Sea to Summit and The North Face. Industrial products include Aircon.Network Philippines, Inc. (A.N.P.I.), Brushstroke Creatives, Primer Printing Services, Inc. (P.P.S.I.), South AmerAsia Chemical Corporation (S.A.C.C.), Stellar Equipment and Machinery, Inc. (S.E.M.I.) and Union Inks and Graphics Philippines, Inc. (U.I.G.P.I.).

References

Retail companies of the Philippines
Companies based in Manila